"Rest in Peace" is the first single from American rock band Extreme's third studio album, III Sides to Every Story. The single was released in August 1992.

Lyrical content
The lyrics are targeted at those who banalize peace when "pretending our hearts are in the right place", or those whose "face shows a trace of hypocrisy". It is then suggested "we can't afford to say these words lightly", "or else our world will truly rest in peace".

Music video
The original music video for the song was inspired by Norman McLaren's short film called Neighbours in which, instead of a flower, the neighbors fight over a TV set showing the band performing the song. The band was sued, but the controversy was quickly settled out of court. They later released a new version of the video, consisting only of the performance montage of the band on a white cyclorama which was displayed on the television set in the original video.

Chart performance
The song reached the US Billboard Hot 100 chart, peaking at  96. It topped the Billboard Album Rock Tracks chart in November 1992. In the UK, the song charted at No. 13 on the UK Singles Chart.

Track listing
 "Rest in Peace" (LP version)
 "Rest in Peace" (radio edit)
 "Peacemaker Die"
 "Monica"

Charts

References

See also
 List of anti-war songs

1992 singles
1992 songs
A&M Records singles
Extreme (band) songs
Music videos directed by Wayne Isham
Songs written by Gary Cherone
Songs written by Nuno Bettencourt